TrustLeaf was an alternative crowd funding service for startups and small businesses to raise money from friends and family using personal loans. It was founded in 2013 and is based in Sunnyvale, California. Anson Liang and Daniel Lieser are cofounders.

Friends and Family Crowdfunding 

Unlike the more common equity or donation/rewards based crowdfunding systems, TrustLeaf arranges and keeps track of personal loans.  Because of legal regulations, such as SEC rules and broker-dealer licensing, the website only allows users to request loans from people with whom they have existing personal relationships, that is, friends and family. User campaigns on TrustLeaf are private, and only visible to potential lenders who receive an invitation.  Once the loans are arranged, Trustleaf sends out reminders when loan payments are due.

Founding 

Anson Liang designed TrustLeaf after a stressful personal experience in figuring out the details of a personal loan from a friend to start a business.  He came up with the idea for a platform that helps set and manage expectations and payments for loans from friends and family. Anson explained the workings of TrustLeaf while being interviewed on the German television show Weltspiegel (World Mirror) in July 2014 on the topic of Asian-American Entrepreneurs in Silicon Valley

Funding Campaigns 

On TrustLeaf, users create a campaign page and invite their friends and family to pledge funding and sign personal loan documents. If they wish, users can calculate and track repayments. A monthly usage fee and individual transactions fees are charged to each user.

References

External links
 Trustleaf on Fin-Tech
 "And the Finalists for the 15th Founder Showcase Pitch Competition are...". Founder Institutle

Companies based in Sunnyvale, California
American companies established in 2013
Defunct crowdfunding platforms of the United States
Internet properties established in 2013